Nkwifa is a settlement some 5 km west of Umzinto. Named after the Nkwifa River which flows past it. Derived from Zulu, the name means 'the spewing one', referring to the waterfall.

References

Populated places in the Umdoni Local Municipality